J.B. Handelsman (February 5, 1922 – June 20, 2007) was a New York-born cartoonist and illustrator whose work appeared for decades in The New Yorker, Punch, Playboy, and other United States and British publications. His sister was American writer Edith Anderson.

Life
Bernard Handelsman was born in the Bronx on February 5, 1922. In adulthood, he adopted John as his first name. He was known professionally as J. B. Handelsman and informally as Bud.
Handelsman studied at the Art Students League and New York University. In 1963, Handelsman moved to England, where he began drawing for Punch. For eleven years, he wrote and illustrated a weekly feature called "Freaky Fables" for the magazine. He returned to the United States in 1982.

From 1961 to 2006, Handelsman had nearly a thousand cartoons and five covers published in The New Yorker. His work also appeared regularly in Playboy and the British humorous magazine Punch.

Handelsman was married to Gertrude Peck, a harpist from Michigan, in 1950. They had three children, Jonathan Handelsman, Peter Handelsman, and Constance Handelsman Bennett.

Published works

Cartoons 

 The New Yorker
 Punch, For 11 years, he produced a full-page weekly feature for Punch, the British humor magazine, called "Freaky Fables.
 Playboy

Illustration
He also illustrated many books, including Families and How to Survive Them and Life and How to Survive It, both by Monty Python star John Cleese and psychotherapist Robin Skynner, and The Mid-Atlantic Companion by David Frost and Michael Shea, plus a number of books for children.

Animation
J.B Handelsman devised a 10-minute animated film for the BBC called In the Beginning, based on the Biblical story of the Creation.

References

 
The New York Times obituary, June 26, 2007, p. B7.

1922 births
2007 deaths
American editorial cartoonists
American expatriates in the United Kingdom
American illustrators
Artists from New York City
Burials at Green River Cemetery
Deaths from lung cancer
The New Yorker cartoonists
People from Long Island
Punch (magazine) cartoonists